A bomb is an explosive device.

Bomb or its variants may also refer to:

Film
"Bomb" (The Young Ones), an episode of The Young Ones
Box-office bomb, which refers to a film for which the production and marketing costs greatly exceeded the revenue retained by the movie studio.

Literature
Bomb (book), Bomb: The Race to Build—and Steal—the World's Most Dangerous Weapon, a 2012 book by Steve Sheinkin
Bomb, a novel by Les Edgerton
Bomb (magazine), an art magazine

Military
Bomb (tank), a famous Canadian Sherman tank from WW II
Bomb or Bomb vessel, a naval ship built around one or more mortars as its primary armament

Music
"Bomb" (Chris Brown song)
"Bombs" (song), a single by Faithless
Dropping bombs, a jazz percussion technique

Science
Bomb (meteorology)
Bomb calorimeter
Volcanic bomb, a mass of molten rock ejected from a volcano

Sports
Bomb (American football), a distinctly arching pass
Bomb (kick), a high kick used in various codes of football

Other uses
Bomb (icon), used on Mac OS and Atari TOS when a fatal error occurs
Bomb shot, a type of alcoholic mixed drink made by dropping a shot into another drink
Bomb, Australian slang for a jalopy
Dahlbusch Bomb, a non-explosive emergency evacuation device for use in mining, called a "bomb" because of its shape
Logic bomb, a form of malicious software
Bomb (village), a village in Punjab, India

See also
Bomba (disambiguation)
Bombed (disambiguation)
Bombe (disambiguation)
Bomber (disambiguation)
Explosion
Shell (projectile)
The Bomb (disambiguation)
Yarn bombing